Dudu (minor planet designation: 564 Dudu) is a minor planet orbiting the Sun. It was discovered 9 May 1905 by German astronomer Paul Götz at Heidelberg, and was named for a female character in the novel Thus Spoke Zarathustra by Friedrich Nietzsche. Based on observations made with the IRAS, 564 Dudu has a diameter of 49.57 ± 4.9 km, a geometric albedo of 0.0484 ± 0.011, and an absolute magnitude (H-value) of 10.43.

References

External links 
 
 

000564
Discoveries by Paul Götz
Named minor planets
000564
000564
19050509